Negar Khatun (also Romanized as Negār Khātūn and Negar Khatoon; also known as Nigar Khātūn) is a village in Khorram Dasht Rural District, in the Central District of Famenin County, Hamadan Province, Iran. At the 2006 census, its population was 1,911, in 425 families.

References 

Populated places in Famenin County